Barfian (also Romanized as Barfīān, Barfeyān, and Barfiyan) is a village in Chahar Cheshmeh Rural District, Kamareh District, Khomeyn County, Markazi Province, Iran. At the 2006 census, its population was 209, in 61 families.

References 

Populated places in Khomeyn County